Ernst Lieb is an American business executive who has assumed the roles of President and CEO of Mercedes-Benz USA on September 1, 2006, replacing Paul Halata. He returned to Australia and became a part owner of a company called Motorworld, which owns Jeep-Chrysler dealerships. He had previously been President and CEO of DaimlerChrysler's Australia & Pacific division. Prior to his role in Australia, he had been President and CEO of Mercedes-Benz Canada since July 1, 1995. He has a long history with Mercedes-Benz, starting in 1975 as a spare-parts specialist.

Mercedes-Benz placed third in the 2010 J.D. Power and Associates Sales Satisfaction Index (SSI) study and surpassed Lexus. 

Lieb has been a resident of Mahwah, New Jersey.

References

1955 births
Living people
German chief executives
Chief executives in the automobile industry
Mercedes-Benz
American chief executives in the automobile industry
People from Mahwah, New Jersey